Zuma is a restaurant founded by chef Rainer Becker, inspired by informal izakaya-style Japanese dining in which dishes are brought to the table continuously throughout the meal.

History
Becker developed the Zuma concept whilst working in Tokyo, where he spent six years learning the intricacies of both Japanese food and culture. In 2002, together with Arjun Waney and Divia Lalvani, Becker launched Zuma's first location in the Knightsbridge area of London. Its success led to the opening of Zuma restaurants in Hong Kong in 2007, Istanbul in 2008, Dubai in 2009, and Miami in 2010.

Locations
Zuma London has an open floor plan designed and styled by Takashi Sugimoto. Launched in 2007, Zuma Hong Kong is located in Central's new luxury mixed-used development: The Landmark. Zuma opened in the Turkish city of Istanbul in 2008 at the Radisson SAS Bosphorus Hotel.

Launched in 2009, Zuma Dubai is located in the heart of the Dubai International Financial Center. By 2010, Zuma saw even more success as it reached the United States, opening in Miami first, and then in New York four years later, with additional U.S. expansion planned. In March 2016, Zuma will open its 10th restaurant in Rome, at the fourth and fifth floor of Palazzo Fendi A branch opened in the Cosmopolitan of Las Vegas in late 2016.

See also
 List of Japanese restaurants

References

External links 
 

Japanese restaurants
Asian restaurants in London
Restaurants in Hong Kong
Restaurants in Istanbul
Restaurants established in 2002
2002 establishments in Turkey
Restaurants in Las Vegas, Nevada
Restaurants in Dubai
Restaurants in Miami
Restaurants in Rome